Miguel García Zúñiga (born 11 August 1971)  is a Mexican former footballer who last played for Trotamundos de Tijuana and current manager of Ascenso MX club Tampico Madero.

External links

1971 births
Living people
Mexican footballers
Association football defenders
C.F. Monterrey players
Santos Laguna footballers
Liga MX players
Ascenso MX players
Mexican football managers
Footballers from Guadalajara, Jalisco